Señorita República Dominicana 1974 was held on February 2, 1974. There were 28 candidates who competed for the national crown. The winner represented the Dominican Republic at the Miss Universe 1974 . The Virreina al Miss Mundo will enter Miss World 1974. Only the 27 province, 1 municipality entered. On the top 10 they showed their evening gown and answered questions so they could go to the top 5. In the top 5 they would answer more questions.

Results

Señorita República Dominicana 1974 : Jacqueline María Cabrera Vargas (Espaillat)
Virreina al Miss Mundo : Giselle María Scanlon Grullón (La Vega)
1st Runner Up : Gina Duarte (Salcedo)
2nd Runner Up : Ana Rojas (Santo Domingo de Guzmán)
3rd Runner Up : Milvia Suarez (Santiago)

Top 10

Isaura Ureña (Puerto Plata)
Maira Cuello (Dajabón)
Levi Cardona (Valverde)
Joana Veras (Distrito Nacional)
Digna Ferreira (Azua)

Special awards
 Miss Rostro Bello – Ana Rojas (Santo Domingo de Guzmán)
 Miss Photogenic (voted by press reporters) - Laura Tavares (Séibo)
 Miss Congeniality (voted by Miss Dominican Republic Universe contestants) - Tatiana Cruz (San Pedro)
 Best Provincial Costume - Ana Rodríguez (Santiago Rodríguez)

Delegates

 Azua - Digna María Ferreira Díaz
 Baoruco -  Mabel Daya Duarfte Castro
 Barahona - Edickta Melan Martínez Caba
 Dajabón - Ana Maira Cuello Victo
 Distrito Nacional - Joana Cindy Veras Terrenas
 Duarte - Julia Mildred Martes Peralta
 Espaillat - Jacqueline María Cabrera Vargas
 Independencia - Cecilia Ceneyda Rosario de Vargas
 La Altagracia - Marisela Reyna Solano Roig
 La Estrelleta - Ana Carolina Padron Zamora
 La Romana - Patria Sonia de la Cruz Salcedo
 La Vega - Giselle María Scanlon Grullón
 María Trinidad Sánchez - Janet Van Zamr Batista
 Monte Cristi - Auxiliadora Carmen Hernández Sosa
 Pedernales - Marisol Victoria del Río Pidres
 Peravia - Julisa Isaura Henriquez Marron
 Puerto Plata - Isaura Rita Ureña del Rosario Vargas
 Salcedo - Ana Gina Duarte Víllanueva
 Samaná - Lila Patricia Mendoza Sonza
 Sánchez Ramírez - Isabel Fernanda Martínez Matos
 San Cristóbal -  Reyna Julie Gómez Fernández
 San Juan de la Maguana - Cristina Estafnia Ynoa Reynosa
 San Pedro - Tatiana Sandra Cruz Sosa
 Santiago - Milvia Trinidad Suarez Sánchez 
 Santiago Rodríguez - Ana Gabriela Santos Rodríguez
 Séibo - Laura Carolina Tavares Batista
 Santo Domingo de Guzmán - Ana Cristina Rojas Merano
 Valverde - Levi del Mar Cardona Sierro

Miss Dominican Republic
1974 beauty pageants
1974 in the Dominican Republic